Hawaii-born musician Jack Johnson has released eight studio albums, one soundtrack album, one remix album, two live albums, two extended plays (EPs), twenty-one singles and four video albums.

Johnson's first album was the result of his primary hobbies, film-making and surfing. He used his songs in his personal surf videos, and released a soundtrack accompanying his film Thicker Than Water. His first commercial record was Brushfire Fairytales, and the highest selling of his albums is In Between Dreams. All of Johnson's albums have been released through his personal record label, Brushfire Records.

As of 2010, Johnson has sold 10.8 million copies of albums in the United States according to Nielsen SoundScan. As of 2015, Johnson has sold 20 million albums worldwide.

Albums

Studio albums

Soundtrack albums

Live albums

Compilation albums

Remix albums

Extended plays

Singles

Notes

Other charted songs

Video albums

Other appearances

References

Discographies of American artists